The 2019 CS Finlandia Trophy was held in October 2019 in Espoo. It was part of the 2019–20 ISU Challenger Series. Medals were awarded in the disciplines of men's singles, ladies' singles, pair skating, and ice dance.

Entries
The International Skating Union published the list on entries on September 19, 2019.

Changes to preliminary assignments

Results

Men

Ladies

Pairs

Ice dance

References

CS Finlandia Trophy
2019 in Finnish sport